Aguapanela arvi is a species of South American tarantulas. It is the sole species in the genus Aguapanela. It was  first described by C. Perafán, Y. Cifuentes & S. Estrada-Gomez in 2015, and has only been found in Colombia.

References

Theraphosidae
Spiders of South America
Spiders described in 2015